The School of Engineering at the National Autonomous University of Mexico (UNAM) is the most prestigious engineering school in Latin America and one of the top engineering schools worldwide. At the undergraduate level, it offers thirteen majors and some graduate programs. In fall 2008, the school of engineering had over 10,900 undergraduate students and 1,115 graduate students and postdocs.

The studies on Chemistry, as for chemical engineering, are offered by UNAM's own School of Chemistry.

History

The school of Engineering at the UNAM has its origins as the Real Seminario de Mineria (Royal School of Mining), which building is still standing near the Zocalo in Mexico City.  After the university was closed in 1833, several scientific institutes were established in Mexico, all of them related to some branch of engineering. These eventually merged into a single institution which in 1910 was put under the supervision of the newly created UNAM and renamed to Escuela Nacional de Ingeniería (National School of Engineering).

In 1954 the school changes its location to Ciudad Universitaria.  In 1959, with the creation of the Engineering Institute and the availability of its first graduate program, the school changes its name to Facultad de Ingeniería.

Organization and departments

The school of engineering is organized in divisions (somewhat the equivalent of departments), each under the direct supervision of a Head of division.  These are themselves coordinated and supervised by the faculty dean, currently Carlos Agustín Escalante Sandoval.

  Fundamental Science Division (DCB):
Is in charge of subjects such as physics and mathematics, every student has to take one or more subjects of this department, specially during the first 4 semesters. These subjects on fundamental science are then common to all students and are often regarded as the most difficult among all.

 Mechanical and Industrial Engineering Division (DIMEI):
In charge of the majors in the name, is the contact between the school and the industry, there are some programs for young entrepreneurial and some courses that may resemble a BA program in US

 Civil and Geomatic Engineering Division (DICyG)

The civil Engineering division is one of the oldest divisions and has great prestige. Many famous researchers, and business leaders, such as Carlos Slim have studied in this division.

 Electrical Engineering Division (DIE): The Electric Engineering Division is in charge of three different bachelor's degrees: Electric Engineering, Computer Engineering and Telecommunication Engineering. It is the biggest division by number of students, as the degrees it offers have a high employment rate. This division, especially the computer engineering department, has established many on-going collaborations with industry and academia, such as: Google, Intel, IBM, Oracle, Telmex, Microsoft, Carnegie Mellon University, UC Berkeley, Stanford, and Wikimedia Foundation. The DIE has a head chair that coordinates these different departments. The current chair is Dr. Boris Escalante. Each department also has its own chair and coordinator. The department with most students, faculty and infrastructure is the Computer Engineering department, whose current coordinator is professor Norma Elva Chavez.
 Earth Sciences Engineering (DICT):
This division is organizes the Mining, Petroleum, Geophysics and Geology Engineering bachelor Programs. Is one of the oldest divisions in the school and currently has some joint programs with PEMEX among other petroleum companies.

 Distance and Continuing Education Division:
As the name implies, this division is in charge of courses and diplomas for active professionals who wish to stay up to date with current technological trends or wish to stay in contact with the academic community in some way other than the conventional graduate programs.

 Social Sciences and Humanities Division (DCSyH):

In charge of cultural activities and some subjects, such as literature, ethics and history.

Location and facilities

The school of engineering has numerous facilities, most of which are located in Ciudad Universitaria in Mexico City, between Faculty of Science and the Faculty of Administration.

It has two libraries for undergraduate students and one for graduate ones. It also has some of Mexico's finest laboratories for civil and mechanical engineering, and various laboratories of electronic engineering.

Noted alumni and faculty
Carlos Slim, (Civil Engineer, Business man, and former world's wealthiest person.)
 Jesus Savage, (Professor in Computer Engineering, researcher, and founder of the Mexican Institute of Robotics) 
 Nabor Carrillo Flores (a soil mechanics expert, a nuclear energy advisor and former president of UNAM)
 Rodolfo Neri Vela, (Professor in Telecommunications Engineering and the first Mexican in space)
Daniel Vargas, (Electrical Engineer and Volleyball Olympian)
Jordi Messeguer Gally, (Industrial Engineer and PRD congressman) 
Leda Speciale, (first Mexican woman to be a civil engineer, and currently an honorary professor in the school of engineering) 
Enrique Martínez Romero, (Civil Engineer of the Torre Mayor, and Mexico City's international airport.)
Leonardo Zeevaert, (Civil Engineer of the Torre Latinoamericana)
Mariana Gonzalez, (Electrical Engineer, Entrepreneur, and co-founder of iluMexico, a Mexican social enterprise, that bring solar electricity to all Mexican homes)
 (Professor, researcher and civil engineer who developed important models to predict climate conditions.)
 (Civil Engineer, professor and researcher who innovated in building structures and materials to overcome earthquakes.)
Juan Jacobo Shmittern (Doctorate in Civil Engineering)
California Odha Zertuche Díaz, primary developer of the drinking water and sewerage system in Ensenada, Mexico.

UNAM School of Engineering rankings

According to the QS Universities Rankings (2012) the School of Engineering is positioned in the following rankings:
Computer and Electrical Engineering: 51-100

Civil Engineering:51-100

Mechanical Engineering:151-200

Student organizations

The school of engineering has several student organizations, among them a Tuna, a chorus and a photo club.

Each major has its own student organization, which is in charge of promoting activities related to each specialization, such as extracurricular courses, workshops or congresses.

SAFIR Sociedad Astronómica de la Facultad de Ingeniería (Astronomical Society of the Faculty of Engineering )

Presidents of SAFIR

Graduate programs
Each division within the school of engineering organizes graduate programs. There are also graduate programs in cooperation with other graduate programs and other higher education institutions in Mexico.

References

External links
Facultad de Ingeniería–UNAM, official website 

National Autonomous University of Mexico